Carbovaris were a short-lived Hungarian indie rock band based in Budapest, Hungary formed in 2009. The band consisted of members Ármin Jamak (vocals), Dániel Nyitray (bass), Soma Balázs (guitars), Zsombor Lehoczky (drums).

History
In 2012 the band's first LP was released entitled Milos.

In 2013, the band was nominated as the best new act in Hungary by the Viva TV.

On 6 December 2013, Carbovaris released two singles, Sand & Dust and Automatic/Pragmatic, from their forthcoming album.

On 12 December 2013, Carbovaris played at the A38 in Budapest, Hungary. The show was available on stream.

Carbovaris played their last show at the Gozsdu Manó Klub in Budapest on 31 January 2014.

Band members

Current line-up
Ármin Jamak – lead vocals (2009–2014)
Soma Balázs – bass guitar (2009–2014)
Dániel Nyitray – bass guitar (2009–2014)
Zsombor Lehoczky – drums (2009–2014)

Former members

Touring members

Timeline

Discography
Albums
 Milos (2011)
 A Very Milos Holiday (2013)

See also
Budapest indie music scene
Amber Smith

References

External links
Official site

Musical groups established in 2009
Hungarian indie rock groups